Rigers Dushku (born 8 September 1991, in Tiranë) is an Albanian professional footballer who currently plays for Tërbuni Pukë in the Albanian First Division.

References

1991 births
Living people
Footballers from Tirana
Albanian footballers
Association football midfielders
FK Partizani Tirana players
Besa Kavajë players
KF Apolonia Fier players
FK Kukësi players
Flamurtari Vlorë players
KF Tërbuni Pukë players
Kategoria Superiore players
Kategoria e Parë players